The 2015 Asia-Pacific Rally Championship season is an international rally championship sanctioned by the FIA. The championship was contested by a combination of regulations with Group N competing directly against Super 2000 cars for points.

The championship began in New Zealand on 17 April and concluded in China on 1 November. The Asia Cup sub-championship will continue on until a 13 December finish in India. The championship was held over six events with a candidate event included as part of the Asia Cup.

Event calendar and results

The 2015 APRC is as follows:

Championship standings
The 2015 APRC for Drivers points was as follows:

Note: 1 – 14 refers to the bonus points awarded for each leg of the rally for the first five place getters, 1st (7), 2nd (5), 3rd (3), 4th (2), 5th (1). There were two bonus legs for each rally.

Pacific Cup

Asia Cup

References

External links

APRC Live Podcast
APRC News and Video

Asia-Pacific Rally Championship seasons
Asia-Pacific
Asia-Pacific
Asia-Pacific